United States Championships or United States Championship may refer to:
 IWGP United States Championship, professional wrestling
 NHRA U.S. Nationals, drag racing
 U.S. Chess Championship, invitational tournament
 U.S. Figure Skating Championships
 US Indoor Championships, women's tennis, 1907–2001
 US PGA Championship, golf
 USA Indoor Track and Field Championships
 USA Outdoor Track and Field Championships
 United States Nordic Combined Championships, skiing
 United States Open Championship, golf
 United States Open Tennis Championships
 United States Road Racing Championship
 United States Swimming Championships
 United States bandy championship
 WWE United States Championship, professional wrestling

See also
 United States Amateur Championships (disambiguation)
 U.S. National Championships (disambiguation)